Tony F. White (born February 15, 1965) is a retired American professional basketball player. He was a 6'2" (188 cm) 170 lb (77 kg) guard. He played for three teams in the NBA before pursuing a career in Europe. Born in Charlotte, North Carolina White played for Independence High School of his hometown, before enrolling to Tennessee to play college basketball.

College career
Tony White was born in Charlotte, North Carolina. He played collegiately at the University of Tennessee from 1983 to 1987. He is third all-time leading scorer for Tennessee with 2,219 points. He appeared in 127 games averaging 17.5 points per game. He also holds the school record for most points scored in a single game with 51.

Professional career
White was selected by the Chicago Bulls with the 10th pick in the 2nd round of the 1987 NBA Draft. In his only season (1987–88) he played 2 games for the Bulls, registering no statistics. He split the remainder of the season with the New York Knicks and the Golden State Warriors. After he left in NBA, he played for Presto  Ice Cream in Philippine Basketball Association in the Philippines.

He played in Greece with AEK, Aris, and Papagou.

Personal life
His son, Tony White, Jr. played for the College of Charleston Cougars men's basketball team from 2006 to 2010. In 2019, White was diagnosed with Leukemia.

References

External links 
 NBA.com Profile
 NBA Stats @ BasketballReference.com

1965 births
Living people
AEK B.C. players
All-American college men's basketball players
American expatriate basketball people in Belgium
American expatriate basketball people in France
American expatriate basketball people in Greece
American expatriate basketball people in Israel
American expatriate basketball people in Spain
American expatriate basketball people in Switzerland
American men's basketball players
Aris B.C. players
Basketball players from Charlotte, North Carolina
Bàsquet Manresa players
CB Valladolid players
Chicago Bulls draft picks
Chicago Bulls players
Golden State Warriors players
Greek Basket League players
Israeli Basketball Premier League players
La Crosse Catbirds players
Liga ACB players
Maccabi Rishon LeZion basketball players
New York Knicks players
Olympique Antibes basketball players
Papagou B.C. players
Point guards
Tennessee Volunteers basketball players
American expatriate basketball people in the Philippines
Great Taste Coffee Makers players
Philippine Basketball Association imports